The Killer Inside Me is a 1952 novel by American writer Jim Thompson published by Fawcett Publications.

In the introduction to the anthology Crime Novels: American Noir of the 1950s, it is described as "one of the most blistering and uncompromising crime novels ever written."

Plot summary
The story is told through the eyes of its protagonist, Lou Ford, a 29-year-old deputy sheriff in a small Texas town. Ford appears to be a regular, small-town cop leading an unremarkable existence; beneath this facade, however, he is a cunning, depraved sociopath with sadistic sexual tastes. Ford's main outlet for his dark urges is the relatively benign habit of deliberately needling people with clichés and platitudes despite their obvious boredom: "If there's anything worse than a bore," says Lou, "it's a corny bore." 

Despite having a steady girlfriend, childhood friend and schoolteacher Amy Stanton, Ford falls into a passionate, sadomasochistic relationship with a prostitute named Joyce Lakeland. Ford describes their affair as unlocking "the sickness" that has plagued him since adolescence, when he sexually abused a little girl, a crime for which his elder foster brother Mike took the blame to spare Lou from prison. After serving a jail term, Mike died at a construction site. Lou blamed a local construction magnate, Chester Conway, for Mike's death, suspecting he was murdered for refusing to help further Conway's schemes.

To exact revenge, Lou and Joyce blackmail the construction magnate to avoid exposing his son's affair with Joyce. However, Lou double-crosses Joyce: He ferociously batters her, and shoots the construction magnate's son, hoping to make the crimes appear to be a lovers' spat gone wrong. Elmer is killed instantly and Sheriff Bob Maples, Lou's mentor, reports that Joyce died after a short stay in a coma. Though Lou believes this means he has gotten away with the crime, county attorney Howard Hendricks becomes suspicious of Lou's version of events, as well as his alibi, and a third person is suspected to be involved. This suspicion falls on Johnnie Pappas, a young small-time criminal who Lou has befriended, and to whom Lou gave some of Conway's money, which is revealed to have been marked. Lou is allowed to enter the distressed Johnnie's cell alone in order to reason with him, only to murder him and stage the scene as a suicide. Though many accept that the case is closed, more people begin to suspect Lou of being involved, including the deputy, Jeff Plummer. This also includes Amy, who presses marriage even after a sadomasochistic encounter with Lou begins to convince her that he is hiding a dark side.

A drifter whom Lou injured earlier attempts to blackmail him, revealing that he eavesdropped on a suspicious conversation Lou was involved in. Lou, seeing a way to tie up multiple loose ends, agrees to pay his blackmailer; he also agrees to elope with Amy, who he is planning to murder. On the night the drifter returns, Lou beats Amy to death, intending to frame the blackmailer for her murder. Plummer kills the drifter after Lou chases him through town, and Lou is sedated and put in a hospital. Lou is visited by Plummer and Hendricks in the hospital, and senses that they both suspect him of killing Amy, Joyce, and Johnnie. Plummer also reveals that Maples killed himself, convinced of Lou's guilt. They show him a letter that Amy had written and intended to give him during their elopement, one which subtly urges him to confess. Lou denies that the letter is incriminating, but Plummer and Hendricks force him into a jail cell, where they try unsuccessfully to provoke a confession with audio of Johnnie's voice and pictures of Amy. 

Eventually, Lou's attorney arrives and releases him, though he admits that he cannot get Lou out of town. Lou ruminates on his past, concluding that his hatred and violence, especially towards women, stemmed from a childhood incident involving his old housekeeper molesting him in order to get back at his father, with whom she was unhappily involved in a sadomasochistic relationship; Lou realizes that his female victims were substitutes for her. Accepting his fate, Lou covers the house in alcohol and candles, intending to kill himself by setting the building on fire. Eventually, Plummer and Hendricks arrive with a team of police, as well as Joyce, who is revealed to be alive, albeit badly injured. Joyce assures Lou that she did not sell him out, and he affirms his affection for her before stabbing her to death. The police fire on Lou, killing him, but destroying the house in the process.

Film adaptations
In 1976, the novel was adapted into a film of the same title, directed by Burt Kennedy and starring Stacy Keach as Lou Ford and Tisha Sterling as Amy Stanton. A 2010 version written by John Curran, directed by Michael Winterbottom and starring Casey Affleck and Jessica Alba premiered at the Sundance Film Festival in January 2010, and was released in theaters later that year.

In popular culture
The novel is referenced in the Dead Milkmen song "Sri Lanka Sex Hotel", on their 1988 LP, Beelzebubba.  The song "The Killer Inside Me" by experimental hip-hop artist MC 900 Ft. Jesus is based on the novel.

Filmmaker Stanley Kubrick, who worked with Thompson on the script for the 1956 movie The Killing,  praised the novel, stating that it was "probably the most chilling and believable first-person story of a criminally warped mind I have ever encountered."

The post-punk/alternative-country rock band Green on Red titled their 1987 album The Killer Inside Me after the book.

Bruce Springsteen has stated that the idea for his 1995 song "My Best Was Never Good Enough" (on the album The Ghost of Tom Joad) came from this book, specifically Ford's penchant for speaking in cliches.

In 2013, the Norwegian band The Launderettes released their album Getaway, which was inspired by the novel.  The band uses the album as a "means to end the story differently."

In the 1996 film Normal Life, the protagonist Chris Anderson, an ex-cop turned criminal, recommends the novel to a police officer and gives him a copy as a present.

Criticism 
C. Namwali Serpell has outlined a phenomenological, postcritical reading of The Killer Inside Me that exposes the limitations of purely ideological interpretations of the novel.

See also
Lou Ford later appears in Thompson's novel Wild Town (1957). The Lou Ford character in Wild Town is a mirror image of the one in The Killer Inside Me. In Wild Town Lou Ford is also a sheriff, he also plays the fool, and he is also smarter and more capable than anyone else in the small town although he keeps it well hidden. He also prefers, and is usually able, to manipulate events rather than directly intervene. However, whereas Lou Ford manipulates events to further his own greed and lust in The Killer Inside Me, in Wild Town he manipulates events to bring about justice, to help people, and even to play matchmaker.

References

External links

1952 American novels
Novels by Jim Thompson
American novels adapted into films
Fiction with unreliable narrators
Novels set in Texas
Hardboiled crime novels
Fawcett Publications